Lea Loveless Maurer (born April 1, 1971), née Lea E. Loveless, is an American former competition swimmer, Olympic champion, and former college swimming coach.  She represented the United States at the 1992 Summer Olympics in Barcelona, Spain, where she won a gold medal swimming the backstroke leg of the women's 4×100-meter medley relay.  She also won a bronze medal in the 100-meter backstroke.  She was the head coach of the Stanford University women's swimming and diving team from 2005 to 2012.

Swimming career
Maurer was born in Yonkers, New York. Early in her career, she was coached by John Collins of the Badger Swim Club in Larchmont, New York, a coach and team that also produced Olympic champions Rick Carey and Cristina Teuscher. She attended the University of Florida in 1989 and 1990, where she swam for the Florida Gators swimming and diving team under coach Randy Reese. She transferred to Stanford University prior to the 1992 Olympics.  Lea broke the 100m backstroke American record at 100.82 at the Barcelona Olympic Games leading off the World-Record earning 1992 medley relay. Lea later  won the gold at the World championships in Perth, Australia in 1998  bettering her own American Record to 100.77.  In addition to her Olympic and world championship medals, Lea swam on three of Stanford's NCAA swimming championship teams in 1992, 1993 and 1994.  She also won three NCAA individual championships in the 100-meter backstroke and one in the 200-meter backstroke. She continued to compete on the USA National Team until 2000.

Coaching career
Following her retirement from competitive swimming, Loveless Maurer, who is married to fellow Stanford swimmer Erik Maurer, became an assistant swimming coach at Northwestern University in Evanston, Illinois.  From 1995 to 2005, she coached the boys' and girls' swim teams at Lake Forest High School in Lake Forest, Illinois, during which time the girls' team won the state championship in 2002 and 2003, and the boys' team won the state championship in 2003.

In 2005, she was named head coach of the Stanford women's swimming and diving team. She led the team to back-to-back Pac-10 championships in 2010 and 2011 and resigned following the 2012 season. She was inducted into the Stanford Athletic Hall of Fame in 2006.

Maurer is now a volunteer assistant coach for the Stanford men's water polo team since spring 2013.

She is a veteran celebrity swimmer for Swim Across America (SAA), a charitable organization that enlists former Olympic swimmers to raise funds for cancer research, and she has participated in three SAA events.

She is now the assistant head coach for the USC Trojans under Coach Kipp.

See also

 List of Olympic medalists in swimming (women)
 List of Stanford University people
 List of World Aquatics Championships medalists in swimming (women)
 World record progression 4 × 100 metres medley relay

References

External links
  Lea Loveless – Olympic Games results at databaseOlympics.com

1971 births
Living people
American diving coaches
American female backstroke swimmers
American swimming coaches
College swimming coaches in the United States
Florida Gators women's swimmers
World record setters in swimming
Northwestern Wildcats swimming coaches
Olympic bronze medalists for the United States in swimming
Olympic gold medalists for the United States in swimming
Sportspeople from Yonkers, New York
Stanford Cardinal swimming coaches
Stanford Cardinal women's swimmers
Swimmers at the 1992 Summer Olympics
World Aquatics Championships medalists in swimming
Medalists at the 1992 Summer Olympics